Sri Sita Ramula Kalyanam Chootamu Raarandi is a 1998 Indian Telugu-language romance family drama film, produced by Nagarjuna Akkineni under the Great India Entertainments banner and directed by debutant Y. V. S. Chowdary. It stars Akkineni Nageswara Rao, Venkat (in his debut), Chandni  and music composed by M. M. Keeravani. The film was a box office success.

Plot
The film begins in a village where Ramachandra Raju is a toptie person and paterfamilias to his family. To fulfill the last wish of his sister Rajyalakshmi, Ramachandra Raju couples up his daughter Madhavi with her son Krishna when they are infants. After that, while they are immersing her remaining ashes Krishna falls into a river and misplaces. Grief-stricken Rajyalakshmi's husband Chandram leaves to abroad along with Madhavi. Years roll by, the story spins to Dubai, where 4 Indian guys Raju, Sivaji, Kamal, Radha stays together in an apartment performing the various petty jobs. Eventually, Ramachandra Raju fixes an alliance to Madhavi to which she also gives her acceptance and starts to India. On the transit, at Dubai, Madhavi loses the passport when Raju rescues and gives her shelter. Chandram advises her to hold-up until he acquires the new one. During that time, Raju and Madhavi fall for each other. Knowing it, Chandram counsels Raju to arrive as his lost son Krishna, so that, they can easily get approval from Ramachandra Raju. At present, as a flabbergast, the real Krishna also returns. Right now, a confusion takes place but Ramachandra Raju recognizes Raju as a forge and boots him. Here Raju maintains silence to keep up the honor of Chandram. Meanwhile, wedding arrangements Krishna and Madhavi are in progress when Chandram asks Raju and Madhavi to elope to which Raju refuses as he does not want to tarnish the prestige of Ramachandra Raju. At the point in time, both Ramachandra Raju and Krishna overhear the conversation and understand reality. Currently, Ramachandra Raju is in a dichotomy but when he finds Krishna too coming forward with the sacrifice he spreads the glory of love. Finally, the movie ends on a happy note with the marriage of Raju and Madhavi.

Cast

 Akkineni Nageswara Rao as Ramachandra Raju
 Venkat as Raju
 Chandni as Madhavi
 Chandra Mohan as Chandram
 Ahuti Prasad as Raghu
 Murali Mohan as Mohan Rao
 Chalapathi Rao as Qasim
 Banerjee as Venu
 Chandu as Krishna
 Sivaji as Sivaji
 Kamal as Kamal
 Radha Krishna as Radha
 Vinayak as Kishore
 Venniradai Nirmala as Bhavani
 Rama Prabha as Begum
 Kalpana as Rajyalakshmi
 Priya as Priya 
 Krishna Sri as Mahalakshmi
 Neelima Sudha as Lavanya
 Rajeswari as Sujatha
 Durga as Sribajith
 Baby Niharika as Rajyam

Soundtrack

The music was composed by M. M. Keeravani. Lyrics were written by Sirivennela Sitarama Sastry. Music was released on ADITYA Music Company.

References

External links
 

1998 romantic drama films
Films scored by M. M. Keeravani
Indian romantic drama films
1998 directorial debut films
1998 films
Films directed by Y. V. S. Chowdary
1990s Telugu-language films